Drummondville station is a Via Rail station in Drummondville, Quebec, Canada. It is located at 263 Lindsay Street, and was staffed until October 2013, when a machine replaced the tickets window; it is wheelchair-accessible. Several corridor Montreal-Quebec City trains and the long-distance Ocean stop here; the Montreal – Gaspé train was suspended in 2013.

References

External links

 Via Rail page for the Ocean
Via Rail page for the Chaleur

Via Rail stations in Quebec
Transport in Drummondville
Buildings and structures in Centre-du-Québec
Heritage buildings of Quebec